Miss Ann is an album by American keyboardist and composer Wayne Horvitz' band Pigpen recorded in 1993 and released on the independent Tim/Kerr label on October 17, 1995.

Reception
The Allmusic review awarded the album 4 stars.

Track listing
All compositions by Wayne Horvitz except as indicated
 "Miss Ann" (Eric Dolphy) - 4:44   
 "The Very Beginning" - 4:20   
 "Hard Regulator" - 3:02   
 "Stupid" - 5:41   
 "Ballad" - 4:18   
 "Grind" - 4:30   
 "Triggerfingers" (John Zorn) - 3:44   
 "One Last Blues" - 6:55   
 "Caligari" - 4:26  
Recorded at Sound Impressions in Portland, Oregon in November 1993

Personnel
Wayne Horvitz - keyboards
Briggan Krauss - alto saxophone
Fred Chalenor - electric bass
Mike Stone - drums
The Billy Tipton Memorial Saxophone Quartet (tracks 4 & 9): Marjorie de Muynck, Amy Denio, Jessica Lurie, Barbara Marino.

References

Tim/Kerr Records albums
Wayne Horvitz albums
1994 albums